Brachyosteus is an extinct genus of arthrodire placoderm from the Late Frasnian stage of the Late Devonian period. Fossils are found from Bad Wildungen, Germany.

Phylogeny
Brachyosteus is a member of the family Selenosteidae of the clade Aspinothoracidi, which belongs to the clade Pachyosteomorphi, one of the two major clades within Eubrachythoraci. The cladogram below shows the phylogeny of Brachyosteus:

References

Selenosteidae
Placoderm genera